The city of Retalhuleu is situated in south-western Guatemala. It is the departmental seat of Retalhuleu Department as well as the municipal seat of Retalhuleu Municipality.

Retalhuleu stands at about 240 metres above sea level. The city has a population of 90,505 (2018 census). Locally it is nicknamed "Reu."

Brief history
On August 7 and 8, 2021, Retalhuleu was severely affected by rain, which lasted for 36 hours and caused landslides, floods and other damages to Retalhuleu and other Guatemalan cities. (in Spanish)

Sports
The local football club is Deportivo Reu which was founded in 2013 after Juventud Retalteca became defunct. Deportivo Reu play their local games at the Estadio Dr. Óscar Monterroso Izaguirre in the Primera División de Ascenso.

Landmarks
 Map of Retalhuleu

References

External links
 Government of Retalhuleu 
 

Municipalities of the Retalhuleu Department